Lycée Moulay Youssef is an educational institution located in the city of Rabat, Morocco.

The school opened on 1 February 1916 although it was only two weeks later, on 17 February 1916, that it was officially created following the Dahir (decree) issued the same day.

Besides containing secondary level programs, Moulay Youssef is known as the most prestigious Higher School Preparatory Classes nationwide (classes préparatoires aux grandes écoles).

See also

 Education in Morocco
 List of schools in Morocco

References

1916 establishments in Morocco
Educational institutions established in 1916
Schools in Rabat
20th-century architecture in Morocco